Murihau Peak is a peak 1.5 miles west of Armitage Saddle. It rises to 2026 m on the west-east ridge at the head of Blue Glacier, Royal Society Range. Named by New Zealand Geographic Board (NZGB) in 1994. Murihau is a Maori name meaning “area of gentle breeze.”

Mountains of Victoria Land
Scott Coast